Richard fitz Gilbert de Clare (died 15 April 1136) 3rd feudal baron of Clare in Suffolk, was an Anglo-Norman nobleman. A marcher lord in Wales, he was also the founder of Tonbridge Priory in Kent.

Life
Richard was the eldest son of Gilbert Fitz Richard de Clare and Adeliza de Claremont. Upon his father's death, he inherited his lands in England and Wales.

He is commonly said to have been created Earl of Hertford by either Henry I or Stephen, but no contemporary reference to him, including the record of his death, calls him by any title, while a cartulary states that a tenant had held "de Gilleberto, filio Richardi, et de Ricardo, filio ejus, et postea, de Comite Gilleberto, filio Richardi" ("of Gilbert Fitz Richard, and his son Richard, and then of Earl Gilbert Fitz Richard"), again failing to call Richard 'Earl' while giving that title to his son. Thus his supposed creation as earl is without merit, although his status and wealth made him a great magnate in England. There is an old photo document on the Wikipedia page for Tonbridge priory which states that the priory was founded by Richard de Clare EARL of (B.. illegible) and Hertfordshire.

Directly following the death of Henry I, hostilities increased significantly in Wales and a rebellion broke out. Richard was a strong supporter of King Stephen and in the first two years of his reign Richard attested a total of twenty-nine of that king's charters. He was with King Stephen when he formalized a treaty with King David I of Scotland and was a royal steward at Stephen's great Easter court in 1136. He was also with Stephen at the siege of Exeter that summer and was in attendance on the king on his return from Normandy. At this point, Richard apparently demanded more land in Wales, which Stephen was not willing to give him.

In 1136, Richard had been away from his lordship in the early part of the year. He returned to the borders of Wales via Hereford in the company of Brian Fitz Count, but on their separating, Richard ignored warnings of the danger and pressed on toward Ceredigion with only a small force. He had not gone far when, on 15 April, he was ambushed and killed by the men of Gwent under Iorwerth ab Owain and his brother Morgan, grandsons of Caradog ap Gruffydd, in a woody tract called "the ill-way of Coed Grano", near Llanthony Abbey, north of Abergavenny. Today the spot is marked by the 'garreg dial' (the stone of revenge). He was buried in Tonbridge Priory, which he founded.

Aftermath
The news of Richard's death induced Owain Gwynedd, son of Gruffudd ap Cynan, king of Gwynedd to invade his lordship. In alliance with Gruffydd ap Rhys of Deheubarth, he won a crushing victory over the Normans at the Battle of Crug Mawr, just outside Cardigan. The town of Cardigan was taken and burnt, and Richard's widow, Alice, took refuge in Cardigan Castle, which was successfully defended by Robert fitz Martin. She was rescued by Miles of Gloucester, who led an expedition to bring her to safety in England.

Family
Richard married Alice, sister of Ranulf de Gernon, 4th Earl of Chester, by her having: 
 Gilbert Fitz Richard de Clare, d. 1153 (without issue), 1st Earl of Hertford.
 Roger de Clare, d. 1173, 2nd Earl of Hertford.
 Alice de Clare (Adelize de Tonbridge), m. (1) about 1133, Sir William de Percy, Lord of Topcliffe, son of Alan de Percy and Emma de Gant; (2) Cadwaladr ap Gruffydd, brother of Owain Gwynedd
 Robert Fitz Richard de Clare, perhaps died in childhood
 Rohese de Clare, m. Gilbert de Gant, Earl of Lincoln.
 Lucy de Clare, m. Baldwin de Redvers, 1st Earl of Devon.

References

Sources

1136 deaths
Year of birth unknown
Anglo-Normans
Anglo-Normans in Wales
Norman warriors
De Clare family
Burials at Tonbridge Priory, Kent